USS Palos may refer to the following ships of the United States Navy:

 , a tug built in 1865 and later converted to a gunboat. She was decommissioned in 1893.
 , a gunboat built for service in China's Yangtze River. She was decommissioned in 1937.

United States Navy ship names